The 2004–05 NBA season was the Hawks' 56th season in the National Basketball Association, and 37th season in Atlanta. In the 2004 NBA draft, the Hawks selected Josh Childress from Stanford with the sixth pick, and high school star Josh Smith with the seventeenth pick. During the off-season, the team hired Mike Woodson as head coach and acquired All-Star forward Antoine Walker, and Tony Delk from the Dallas Mavericks, Al Harrington from the Indiana Pacers, and Predrag Drobnjak from the expansion Charlotte Bobcats. The team also signed free agents Kenny Anderson, re-signed Jon Barry and former Hawks forward Kevin Willis. The Hawks were not expected to be any good heading into the season posting an awful 2–12 record in November. In December, the team traded Barry to the Houston Rockets for Tyronn Lue. At midseason, Walker was eventually traded back to his former team, the Boston Celtics for All-Star guard Gary Payton, Tom Gugliotta and Michael Stewart, while Anderson was released to free agency and signed with the Los Angeles Clippers. However, Payton never played for the Hawks, and was released and then re-signed with the Celtics for the rest of the season.

Meanwhile, the Hawks went from bad to worse losing 32 of their final 35 games, posting 13 and 14-game losing streaks respectively on their way to finishing with a league worst record at 13–69 (.159), which was their worst winning percentage in franchise history. Harrington led the team with 17.5 points and 7.0 rebounds per game. Despite their awful season, Smith won the Slam Dunk Contest during the All-Star Weekend in Denver, as he and Childress both made the NBA All-Rookie Second Team. Following the season, second-year guard Boris Diaw was traded to the Phoenix Suns for Joe Johnson, Willis and Gugliotta both retired, but Willis would come back for one more season with the Dallas Mavericks before retiring again, and Drobnjak and Stewart were both released to free agency.

For the season, the Hawks added new yellow alternate road uniforms with black side panels, which would last until 2007.

Offseason

Draft picks

Roster

Regular season

Season standings

z - clinched division title
y - clinched division title
x - clinched playoff spot

Record vs. opponents

Game log

Player statistics

Season

Player Statistics Citation:

Awards and records
 Josh Smith, NBA All-Rookie Team 2nd Team
 Josh Childress, NBA All-Rookie Team 2nd Team

Injuries

Transactions

Trades

Free agents

Re-signed

Additions

* = Cut before regular season

Subtractions

References

See also
 2004-05 NBA season

Atlanta Hawks seasons
Atlanta Haw
Atlanta Haw
Atlanta Hawks